Stephen John Harding (born 23 July 1956) is an English retired professional footballer who played as a central defender in the Football League for hometown clubs Bristol Rovers and Bristol City. He also played league football for Grimsby Town, Brentford and Southend United. He went on to play non-League football for Bath City, Trowbridge Town, Gloucester City and Mangotsfield United.

Career statistics

References

1956 births
English footballers
English Football League players
Brentford F.C. players
Living people
Footballers from Bristol
Association football central defenders
Bristol City F.C. players
Southend United F.C. players
Grimsby Town F.C. players
Bristol Rovers F.C. players
Bath City F.C. players
Trowbridge Town F.C. players
Gloucester City A.F.C. players
Mangotsfield United F.C. players

England youth international footballers